Edmonds Underwater Park (EUP) is a local classic scuba diving site in the northern Seattle, Washington suburb of Edmonds immediately north of the Edmonds Washington State Ferry terminal on the Edmonds-Kingston route. EUP is relatively shallow with a maximum depth of about 45 feet. There is a grid network of anchored ropes that lead to a variety of submerged features. The park is built and maintained by a group of volunteers that meet every Saturday and Sunday at 9 am.

Attractions & features
There are several submerged shipwrecks including the large tugboat Triumph. The site is famous for very large ling cod, numerous large cabezon, occasional octopus, many surf perch and rockfish, and a lot of invertebrates. Gray whales have been spotted by divers at this site.

Entrance is via moderate surface swims. There is a restroom with diver dressing areas and an outdoor shower that is functional when the weather is above freezing. Just north of the ferry terminal is a 300-foot (91.4 m) exclusion zone. The site has a good parking area that fills up early. Numerous restaurants and coffee houses are in the immediate area and a local dive shop is conveniently located south of the park on Railroad Avenue.

Lopez Pontoon
A new feature was sunk on November 4, 2009. The Lopez Pontoon is a large concrete piece that served as a bridge fender. Its dimensions are 100'x 20'x 13' and rest west of the Triumph. It has 5 chambers in which a diver may easily enter. The pontoon will serve well as a habitat for fish, invertebrates, and algae and sea weeds.

References

External links
 Shore Diving
 Map of Edmonds Underwater Park
 Sea Otter

Edmonds, Washington
Underwater diving sites in the United States